Les Chutes-de-la-Chaudière may refer to:
 Les Chutes-de-la-Chaudière Regional County Municipality, a former regional county municipality in Quebec
 Les Chutes-de-la-Chaudière-Est, Lévis, Quebec, a borough of Lévis, Quebec
 Les Chutes-de-la-Chaudière-Ouest, Lévis, Quebec, a borough of Lévis, Quebec
 Les Chutes-de-la-Chaudière, the original name of Chutes-de-la-Chaudière (electoral district) in Quebec, in its first election in 1989

See also
 Chaudière (disambiguation)
 Chutes-de-la-Chaudière (disambiguation)